Allison L. Hurst is an American sociologist whose research focuses on the sociology of higher education. She teaches at Oregon State University.

Early life and education 
Hurst graduated from Barnard College, where she majored in ancient studies, in 1992. She completed a doctorate in sociology at the University of Oregon in 2006.

Career 
Hurst was a visiting assistant professor at Kenyon College from 2006 to 2009. She then moved to Furman University, where she taught until 2014, when she was hired as an associate professor at Oregon State University. Her research focuses on the role of social class in the sociology of higher education.

Books

References

External links

Living people
American women sociologists
American sociologists
Sociologists of education
Barnard College alumni
University of Oregon alumni
Furman University faculty
Oregon State University faculty
21st-century social scientists
Year of birth missing (living people)